Dicranocentrus is a genus of slender springtails in the family Entomobryidae. There are about six described species in Dicranocentrus.

Species
These six species belong to the genus Dicranocentrus:
 Dicranocentrus amazonicus g
 Dicranocentrus cuprum g
 Dicranocentrus halophilus Mari Mutt, 1985 g
 Dicranocentrus indicus Bonet, 1930 g
 Dicranocentrus melinus g
 Dicranocentrus wangi g
Data sources: i = ITIS, c = Catalogue of Life, g = GBIF, b = Bugguide.net

References

Further reading

 
 
 

Springtail genera